Sangli constituency may refer to:
 Sangli (Lok Sabha constituency) of the Indian parliament
 Sangli (Vidhan Sabha constituency) of the Maharashtra state parliament